An Hallucinated Alchemist, also known as The Alchemist's Hallucination, was an 1897 French short silent film directed by Georges Méliés. This film is lost. The videos online are not this film, but actually The Mysterious Retort (1906).

Plot 
The film features a star with five female heads and a giant face that has people coming out of its mouth.

Production 
The sets were hand painted.

Release and influence
The film was released by Méliès's Star Film Company and is numbered 95 in its catalogues. The film is currently presumed lost.

The 1900 Edison Manufacturing Company short The Clown and the Alchemist, directed by J. Stuart Blackton and Albert E. Smith, may have been inspired by this film.

References

1897 films
1897 horror films
Films directed by Georges Méliès
Lost horror films
French black-and-white films
Lost French films
French silent short films
French horror films
1890s lost films
1897 short films
Silent horror films
1890s French films